Ambleside is a residential suburb of Devonport, Tasmania, Australia located on the south eastern side of the Mersey River. 

The suburb rises from the river to a hill with a sunny aspect.

The suburb is to the left on the eastern entrance to the city, before the Victoria Bridge.

The soil is a rich red in colour.

References

Suburbs of Devonport, Tasmania